Laticraniini is a tribe of longhorn beetles of the subfamily Lamiinae.

Taxonomy
 Amplitempora
 Laticranium

References

Lamiinae